Beijing Jingshan School is a high school and elementary school, located on Dengshikou road in Beijing, China.

Beijing Jingshan School was founded in 1960, and is the connection center for the Asian New Education Plan of UNESCO. In September 1983, Deng Xiaoping wrote for the School: "Education should be geared toward modernization, toward the world and toward the future." The message was later abbreviated as the "Three Orientations of Education" that has served as an important policy guideline for China's education reform.

The Newton-Beijing Jingshan School Exchange Program, between the Beijing Jingshan School and the Newton Public Schools in Newton, Massachusetts, USA, is the oldest exchange program of public secondary school students between the United States and the People's Republic of China. The city of Newton hosts students and teachers for four months each fall and sends students and teachers to Beijing each spring.

The school's curriculum goes from primary school to high school.

It includes a swimming pool, a school museum, several large courtyards, a cafeteria, a recording room, an observatory for the astronomy club, several calligraphy rooms and art rooms.

All students wear the school's uniform which is different for each school. Primary school students wear white and purple, middle school students wear white and green, and high school students wear white and blue, all with a red strip around the arm and the school's crest and name  on the chest. Primary school students wear the red scarf of the communist party (红领巾 hónglǐngjīn) around the neck.

Jingshan school is also one of the most famous exclusive schools in China. Many central government leaders' offspring studied here, such as Deng Xiaoping's grandchildren, Xi Jinping's daughter, and Bo Xilai's son.

References

External links 
 Official website of Beijing Jingshan School

Schools in Dongcheng District, Beijing
High schools in Beijing
Educational institutions established in 1960
1960 establishments in China